Donald Lynn "Skip" Trump (born July 31, 1945) is an American oncologist who has been the executive director and chief executive officer of the Inova Schar Cancer Institute in Falls Church, Virginia, since January 2015. He has the same first and last name as former United States President Donald Trump, but they are not related to each other.

Early life and education
Trump grew up in Hudson, New York. He received his undergraduate and medical degrees from Johns Hopkins University, where he also completed his fellowship and residency.

Career
Trump's first academic appointment was at Naval Hospital Philadelphia. His later positions included stints at Johns Hopkins, Duke University, and the University of Pittsburgh. In 2002, he joined Roswell Park Comprehensive Cancer Center as its associate institute director and senior vice president for clinical investigations. In 2007, he became the Center's president, a position he held until he retired in December 2014. The chair of Roswell Park's board of directors said that "Roswell Park’s clinical revenues and its unique patient care programs continue to increase as Dr. Trump has been at the forefront of a 'transformation process' at the Institute. Further, he led several important initiatives that have great potential to enhance collaborative relationships with local and regional health care partners, thus benefiting cancer patients not only at Roswell Park, but in upstate New York."

Relationship with President Donald Trump
In addition to his work in oncology, Trump is known for having the same first and last name as businessman and 45th President of the United States Donald J. Trump, although they are not related to each other. This has led to many people asking if he has any connection to the businessman for decades. He has been dubbed "the other Donald Trump". However, in the 2016 election he supported Trump's opponent, Hillary Clinton. In 2010, Donald J. Trump called Dr. Trump to try to get him to include one of the businessman's friends' sons into a clinical trial there. At the time, the son was about to be admitted into the trial. After hearing the news, businessman Trump declined Dr. Trump's offer to shave his head for a "Bald for Bucks" event, but he still wrote the doctor a check for $30,000 through the Donald J. Trump Foundation. In a video the same year, businessman Trump said, "Donald L. Trump, which is you, is probably more important than Donald J. Trump, which is me."

Honors and awards
Trump has received a Lifetime Achievement Award in Medicine/Business from Medaille College, and a Distinguished Alumnus Award from the Johns Hopkins University Alumni Association.

References

External links
.

American oncologists
1945 births
Living people
People from Greencastle, Indiana
People from Hudson, New York
People from Falls Church, Virginia
Johns Hopkins School of Medicine alumni
Johns Hopkins University faculty
Duke University faculty
University of Pittsburgh faculty